Frederick Johnson was a British-Canadian businessman and president of Bell Canada from 1944 to 1953 and chairman until 1960.

References

Canadian chairpersons of corporations
Canadian corporate directors
British corporate directors
People of Bell Canada
British chairpersons of corporations
Year of birth missing
Year of death missing